Slavko Stefanović (born March 28, 1981) is a Serbian former professional basketball player. He played the power forward position.

Professional career
Stefanović began his professional career with Belgrade clubs Beopetrol and Lavovi 063. In November 2004, he signed with Crvena zvezda. He stayed with Zvezda till the end of the season. For the next season he signed with Hemofarm. In the 2006–07 season he did not play because of injury.

Next season he starts with Mega Aqua Monta, but left them in December 2007 and signed with Alba Berlin. He left them in February 2008 and returned to Mega Aqua Monta. In March 2008 he signed with Igokea until the end of the season.

The following season he spent with Universitet Yugra Surgut. He then signed with OKK Beograd but left them during the season and signed with Lukoil Academic. Following season he again started with OKK Beograd, but left them after only two games and signed with Keravnos where he spent rest of the season.

The 2011–12 season he spent with OKK Beograd. For the 2012–13 season he returned to his hometown Užice and signed with KK Sloboda Užice. In March 2013 he got injured and finish his career.

References

External links
 Slavko Stefanović at euroleague.com
 Slavko Stefanović at eurobasket.com

1981 births
Living people
ABA League players
Alba Berlin players
Basketball League of Serbia players
Keravnos B.C. players
KK Beopetrol/Atlas Beograd players
KK Crvena zvezda players
KK Hemofarm players
KK Igokea players
KK Lavovi 063 players
KK Mega Basket players
KK Sloboda Užice players
OKK Beograd players
PBC Academic players
Power forwards (basketball)
Serbian expatriate basketball people in Bosnia and Herzegovina
Serbian expatriate basketball people in Bulgaria
Serbian expatriate basketball people in Cyprus
Serbian expatriate basketball people in Germany
Serbian expatriate basketball people in Russia
Serbian men's basketball players
Sportspeople from Užice